The Thane House is a historic residence at Levy and First Streets in Arkansas City, Arkansas, overlooking the Mississippi River. The 1½-story Craftsman style house was built for Henry Thane in 1909 to a design by Charles L. Thompson. It has a tile roof, with a steeply pitched gable dormer on the front facade.  The center entry is recessed, with a projecting bay to one side which is capped by a three-sided roof. The eaves have exposed rafter ends, and the front gable has false half-timbering.

The house was listed on the National Register of Historic Places in 1982.

See also
National Register of Historic Places listings in Desha County, Arkansas

References

Houses on the National Register of Historic Places in Arkansas
Houses completed in 1919
Houses in Desha County, Arkansas
National Register of Historic Places in Desha County, Arkansas